The Uruguayan Championship 1931 was the 28th official championship of Uruguayan football history. Montevideo Wanderers won their 3rd title and as of 2022 this is their last title.

Overview
The tournament consisted of a two-wheel championship of all against all. It involved eleven teams, and the champion was the Montevideo Wanderers.

Teams

League standings

Notes and references

Uruguay - List of final tables (RSSSF)

Uruguayan Primera División seasons
Uru
1931 in Uruguayan football